Deeply is a 2000 film directed by Sheri Elwood, starring Julia Brendler, Lynn Redgrave and Kirsten Dunst.

Synopsis
Claire McKay (Julia Brendler)—having suffered the death of her boyfriend—is brought by her mother to Ironbound Island in the hopes that time away from the city will allow her to recover emotionally. On the island where her mother was born, Claire meets an eccentric writer, Celia (Lynn Redgrave), who in flashbacks, relates her own story as a grief-stricken teenager in 1949. Celia—Silly (Kirsten Dunst) in the flashbacks—is the next chosen victim of a Viking curse which was placed on the island centuries ago when their longship sank in the bay.

The nature of the curse is such that a "chosen one" is born every fifty years, and they are destined to die at sea in order for the fish the island depends on to continue to return. During the flashbacks Silly discovers a list of past victims, and that she is the next. However, in the end Silly is not claimed by the sea, which instead takes her lover. The narrator says something to the effect of what better alternative to taking the chosen one than to take her lover instead, leaving her to bear the pain.
As Celia tells her own story of love and loss, Claire eventually undergoes a catharsis and again plays the violin that she has not touched since her own loss. The final clips of the movie show a shoal of fish, which points to the fact that the fish do indeed return to the island.

List of curse victims
The following list is found by Silly in the "fish logs" of Ironbound Island, and noted again by Claire as she finds their gravestones.
 1609 January, William Fleming, 17 years, lost at sea
 1659 May, Anne Bell, aged 16, drowned
 1701 August, John Dunsworth, aged 16 yrs., drowned
 1750 March, Eliza Coolen, aged 18 yrs., lost at sea
 1799 December, Ezekiel Dempsey, 16 years, lost at sea
 1849 June, James M. Kay, age 18, lost at sea
 1905 October, Asaph Young, 17 years, drowned
 1949 ...

Cast

Production
The film was shot on East Ironbound island, Nova Scotia.

External links
 

2000 romantic drama films
Films about writers
English-language Canadian films
Canadian romantic drama films
2000 films
Films shot in Nova Scotia
German romantic drama films
2000s English-language films
2000s Canadian films
2000s German films